The 2017 High Country Grizzlies season was the franchise's inaugural season as a professional indoor football franchise; they are an expansion team of the National Arena League.  The Grizzlies were one of eight teams that competed in the NAL for its inaugural 2017 season.

Led by head coach Josh Resignalo, the Grizzlies play their home games at the George M. Holmes Convocation Center on the campus of Appalachian State University.

Standings

Schedule

Regular season
The 2017 regular season schedule was released on December 9, 2016

Key: 

All start times are local time

Roster

References

External links
High Country Grizzlies official website

High Country Grizzlies
High Country Grizzlies
High Country Grizzlies